Porosalvania hydrobiaeformis is a species of minute sea snail, a marine gastropod mollusk or micromollusk in the family Rissoidae.

Description

This is a kind of sea snail

Distribution

References

Rissoidae
Gastropods described in 2007